was a Heian period waka poet and Japanese nobleman. His daughter was the Heian poet and author Sei Shōnagon, famous today for writing The Pillow Book. He is designated a member of the Thirty-six Poetry Immortals, and one of his poems is included in the famous Ogura Hyakunin Isshu. His court career included terms as governor of Kawachi Province and Higo Province.

This group also compiled  readings for texts from the Man'yōshū.

His poems are included in several official poetry anthologies, including the Shūi Wakashū. A personal collection known as the  also remains.

External links 
E-text of his poems in Japanese
Brief biography in English

908 births
990 deaths
10th-century Japanese poets
Hyakunin Isshu poets
Deified Japanese people